William Grant Mitchell (23 May 1865 – 14 January 1904) was an English rugby union fullback who was a member of the first official British Isles team. Mitchell represented several club teams and was an original member of touring team, the Barbarians.

Rugby career
Mitchell was educated at Bromsgrove School before gaining entry to Caius College, Cambridge in 1884. Mitchell played for Cambridge University, and in 1886 won a sporting Blue when he played in The Varsity Match. In 1890, Mitchell, now playing for Richmond was selected to represent England as part of the 1890 Home Nations Championship. England had just returned to international rugby after two years in exile after refusing to join the International Rugby Board, but began badly losing to Wales, which was the first Welsh victory over the English. Mitchell kept his place, and was in the England squad that was victorious over Scotland and Ireland in the final two games of the Championship.

1890 saw Mitchell join William Percy Carpmael's newly formed invitational touring team, the Barbarians; and his Cambridge roots served him well the next season when, after playing all three games of the 1891 Championship, he was selected to join Bill Maclagan's 1891 British Isles team that toured South Africa. He played in all three Test matches, which the tourist won by narrow margins; Mitchell himself scored the only points in the Second Test at Kimberley with a goal from mark. On his return to Britain he was selected for one final international, the 1893 clash with Scotland.

Bibliography

References

1865 births
1905 deaths
British & Irish Lions rugby union players from England
English rugby union players
England international rugby union players
Rugby union fullbacks
Cambridge University R.U.F.C. players
Barbarian F.C. players
Richmond F.C. players
Alumni of Gonville and Caius College, Cambridge
People educated at Bromsgrove School